The 1820 Massachusetts gubernatorial election was held on April 3, 1820.

Incumbent Federalist Governor John Brooks won re-election to a fifth term, defeating Democratic-Republican nominee William Eustis.

General election

Candidates
John Brooks, Federalist, incumbent Governor
William Eustis, Democratic-Republican, incumbent U.S. Representative, former Secretary of War

Results

References

1820
Massachusetts
Gubernatorial